"We Will Together" is a song by Eurogliders, released in April 1985 as the lead single from their third studio album, Absolutely! (1985). The song peaked at number 7 on the Australian Kent Music Report.

Track listing
7" Single
Side A "We Will Together"
Side B "Wildlife" (live)

12" Single
Side A	"We Will Together" (The Mombassa Mix) - 5:46
Side B "Someone" (The Euro Mix) - 4:42
Side B "It's the Way" (The Work Mix) - 4 :28

Chart performance

Weekly charts

Year-end charts

References 

1985 singles
Eurogliders songs
1984 songs
CBS Records singles